Nizami, Azerbaijan may refer to:
 Nizami, Goranboy
 Nizami, Sabirabad